Old Believers is the 2012 album release by Cory Chisel and The Wandering Sons.

Track listing

Charts

References 

2012 albums
Cory Chisel and The Wandering Sons albums